William Arthur Wragg (1875 – after 1904) was an English professional footballer who made 119 appearances in the Football League playing for Nottingham Forest, Leicester Fosse, Small Heath and Chesterfield Town.

Wragg was born in Radford, Nottinghamshire.

Nottingham Forest 
He played local football before joining Nottingham Forest in April 1896. Wragg made his debut on 28 November 1896 at home against Liverpool. In the early part of his career he played at wing half, and from this position he created Forest's first goal in the 1898 FA Cup Final. From his free kick from the left near the by-line, the ball came to Arthur Capes who shot through a crowd of defenders. Wragg later aggravated a first-half injury and had to move out to the wing, unable to take much further part in the game.  He made 58 appearances in all competitions for Forest. He scored his only goal for Nottingham Forest on 2 October 1897 in the 1-1 draw at home against Sunderland.

Leicester Fosse 
After three years he joined Leicester Fosse, where he spent two seasons, made 50 appearances in the Second Division playing at full back, and became the club's free kick specialist.

Later career 
A move to Small Heath brought him just the one first-team appearance because of the form of George Adey. In August 1901 he joined Southern League club Watford, and a year later moved to Hinckley Town of the Midland League. He returned to the Football League to play 20 Second Division games for Chesterfield Town, and then went back to non-league football with Accrington Stanley, Doncaster Rovers and Brighton & Hove Albion.

Post Football 
Wragg appeared on stage with Stan Laurel and Charlie Chaplin.

Career statistics

Honours
 Nottingham Forest
 FA Cup winner: 1898

References 

1875 births
Year of death missing
Footballers from Nottingham
English footballers
Association football defenders
Newstead Byron F.C. players
Nottingham Forest F.C. players
Leicester City F.C. players
Birmingham City F.C. players
Watford F.C. players
Hinckley Town F.C. players
Chesterfield F.C. players
Accrington Stanley F.C. (1891) players
Doncaster Rovers F.C. players
Brighton & Hove Albion F.C. players
English Football League players
Southern Football League players
Date of birth missing
Place of death missing
FA Cup Final players